Western Justice is a 1934 American Western film directed by Robert N. Bradbury and starring Bob Steele. Steele sings in the film. Scenes were shot around Buena Vista Lake.

Cast
 Bob Steele as Jim, alias Ace
 Rene Borden as Bee Brent (as Renee Borden)
 Julian Rivero as Pancho Lopez, alias Jack
 Arthur Loft as Clem W. Slade
 Lafe McKee as Sheriff, alias King
 John Cowell as John Brent (as Jack Cowell)
 Perry Murdock as Rufe
 Vane Calvert as Aunt Emma

References

External links
 

1934 films
1934 Western (genre) films
American Western (genre) films
American black-and-white films
1930s English-language films
Films directed by Robert N. Bradbury
1930s American films